Joan Hopkins (31 August 1915 – 27 December 2002) was a British stage and film actress. During the late 1940s she appeared in starring roles in several productions, including Princess Charlotte in The First Gentleman and as Helen in the box office success The Weaker Sex (both 1948). Her final appearance was in the 1950 thriller Double Confession. After this she appeared in television for several years. She was married to the film director Henry Cass.

Filmography
 We Dive at Dawn (1943)
 Temptation Harbour (1947)
 The First Gentleman (1948) 
 The Affairs of A Rogue (1948)
 The Weaker Sex (1948)
 Man on the Run (1949)
 The Chiltern Hundreds (1949)
 Double Confession (1950)

References

Bibliography
 Brian McFarlane & Anthony Slide. The Encyclopedia of British Film: Fourth Edition. Oxford University Press, 2013.
 Philip Gillett. Forgotten British Film: Value and the Ephemeral in Postwar Cinema. Cambridge Scholars Publishing, 2017.

External links
 

1915 births
2002 deaths
British film actresses
People from Wandsworth
Actresses from London